Bootleg is a 2002 miniseries for children, commissioned by the BBC and based on a book of the same name by Alex Shearer. It was shown as a three-part series in the UK, with subsequent broadcasts in Australia and all over the world.

The novel has been adapted in Japan in the form of manga and 13 episode ONA series under the title .

Plot
The film is about a new political party called the "Good for You" (abbreviated as GFY) which comes into power and bans chocolate. Two kids named Smudger Moore and Huntley Hunter want to get their chocolate back. They begin by selling bootleg chocolate, and go on to join an underground resistance organization.

The film climaxes in a huge revolution where people take to the streets. They demand that chocolate be brought back, and that the government be overthrown.

It tells us about how they face ups and downs on their way.

Media

Book
Bootleg was first published as a book written by Alex Shearer and is published by Macmillan Children's Books on 4 July 2003.

TV series
The adaptation, commissioned by BBC was made into a three-part series and was first broadcast in the United Kingdom and later in Australia.

It has won a British Academy of Film and Television Arts Award for Best Children's Drama, with the screenplay written by Paul Smith.

The TV adaptation features British actors Martin Jarvis, Steven Geller and Gemma Jones.

Manga
The manga adaptation was done by Japanese manga artist, Aiji Yamakawa. It was serialized in Shueisha's shōjo monthly manga magazine, Bessatsu Margaret from its 2nd issue and ended on the 15th issue of the magazine in the year 2008.

It has only one volume and was released in October 2008.

Anime
The anime adaptation of the manga is written by Kiyoko Yoshimura and animated by Production I.G with original character designs provided by Aiji Yamakawa. voice actor Fumie Mizusawa and Toshiyuki Toyonaga voices the main characters, Smudger Moore and Huntley Hunter respectively and Japanese singer, Maaya Sakamoto voicing Carol Hunter.

The adaptation's theme song and insert song are sung by Kana Nishino. The theme song's title is Make Up and the insert song is titled as Kirari and is released under SME Records.

Cast
Smudger Moore – Fumie Mizusawa
Huntley Hunter – Toshiyuki Toyonaga
Louise Bubby – Mikako Takahashi
Director of Headquarters – Katsuyuki Konishi
Ron Moore – Keiji Fujiwara
Joe Crawley – Kenjirō Tsuda
Carol Hunter – Maaya Sakamoto
Kylie Moore – Rie Nakagawa
John Blades – Tatsuhisa Suzuki

Source:

References

Other references
 Shearer, Alex. Bootleg. Macmillan Children's Books, July 2003.

External links
 
 
 Burberry Productions'
 Chocolate Underground Official Site
 

2000s British children's television series
2002 British television series debuts
2002 British television series endings
2008 manga
BBC children's television shows
BBC television dramas
2000s British television miniseries
Production I.G
Shōjo manga
Films scored by David Hirschfelder
Chocolate in fiction